Ķekava Bulldogs is a Men's Highest Floorball League of Latvia team based in Ķekava, Latvia.

Goaltenders
  6  Jānis Bramanis
91  Ivars Dišereits

Defencemen
4   Jānis Belasovs
11  Gints Timoško
12  Toms Briedis
21  Mārtiņš Druvkalns
33  Toms Mežotnis
46  Jānis Bilinskis

Forwards
  5  Jānis Liepa
  8  Kristaps Jēkabsons
  9  Gunārs Klēģers
10  Mārtiņš Brigmanis
15  Jānis Peičs
18  Ēriks Akulovs
25  Alvis Dāle
37  Sergejs Sevrjuks
44  Gints Klēģers
74  Gints Fricbergs

References

External links
Official Website

Floorball in Latvia
Latvian floorball teams
Ķekava Municipality